Bonnemaisonia is a genus of red algae belonging to the family Bonnemaisoniaceae.

The genus name of Bonnemaisonia is in honour of Théophile Bonnemaison (1774–1829), a French pharmacist, botanist and naturalist from Quimper.

The genus has almost cosmopolitan distribution.

Species:

Bonnemaisonia asparagoides 
Bonnemaisonia clavata 
Bonnemaisonia geniculata 
Bonnemaisonia hamifera 
Bonnemaisonia nootkana

References

Bonnemaisoniaceae
Red algae genera